Maselheim is a municipality in the district of Biberach in Baden-Württemberg in Germany.

Mayors
1946–1954: Johann G. Härle
1954–1963:  Josef Buck
1963–1991: Roland Schmid
1991–present: Elmar Braun (born 1956), first Green mayor in the Federal Republic of Germany

References

External links
 

Biberach (district)
Württemberg